Lieutenant-General Sir Alfred Edward Codrington,  (4 May 1854 – 12 September 1945), was a British Army officer who served in colonial wars in Africa during the late nineteenth century, and later commanded a reserve army during the First World War.

Military career
Born in 1854, the second son of General Sir William Codrington, he was educated at Harrow and entered the Coldstream Guards in 1873. He first saw active service during the Anglo-Egyptian War of 1882, where he was mentioned in despatches.

He later commanded the 1st Battalion Coldstream Guards in the Second Boer War between 1899 and 1902, where he was wounded twice. He took part in the Battle of Magersfontein on 10–11 December 1899, in which the defending Boer force defeated the advancing British forces amongst heavy casualties for the latter. Codrington was mentioned in the despatch from Lord Methuen describing the battle and how he "though wounded, insisted on remaining in command of his battalion till nightfall". In March 1900 he was stationed at the British camp at Modder River, when he was reported to be with a small party of officers foraging at farms north of Bloemfontein. They were caught by Boer troops, and he was wounded in the leg. He was mentioned in despatches later in the war, and given a brevet promotion as colonel. For his service, he received the Queen's medal with three clasps, and the King's medal with two clasps. After his return to the United Kingdom, he was placed on half-pay as he resigned his command of the 1st battalion on 28 October 1902.

He commanded the 1st London Division of the Territorial Force from 1908 to 1909, when he was appointed Major-General commanding the Brigade of Guards and General Officer Commanding London District, retiring from this post in 1913. He returned to duty after the outbreak of the First World War, serving as the Military Secretary to Lord Kitchener, the Secretary of State for War, from August until October 1914. He was then appointed to command Third Army in the Home Forces; this was based around Luton, and contained four Territorial divisions and two Territorial cavalry brigades. He relinquished command in 1916. He was appointed to sit on a Pensions Appeal Tribunal in the summer of 1917, which dealt with appeals against governmental decisions on military pensions, and later published a book on War Pensions: Past and Present, co-authored with Edward Abbott Parry, another member of the Tribunal.

His final military position was the ceremonial colonelcy of the Coldstream Guards, to which he was appointed in 1918. Unusually, this had been a position previously occupied by his father. He was appointed chairman of the Society of Miniature Rifle Clubs in 1917, and President of the Association in 1932.

Family
He married Adela Harriet Portal, the niece of the Earl of Minto, in 1885; she died in 1935. The couple had three sons, Geoffrey, William, and John, and one daughter, Mary. Colonel Sir Geoffrey Codrington became the High Sheriff of Wiltshire and was an usher to both King George VI and Queen Elizabeth II, while William was the Chief Security Officer to the War Cabinet during the Second World War and later High Sheriff of Rutland.

Notes

References
"CODRINGTON, Lieut-Gen. Sir Alfred Edward ". (2008). In Who Was Who 1897–2007. Online edition.

 

|-
 

|-
 

|-

 

|-

1854 births
1945 deaths
British Army lieutenant generals
Coldstream Guards officers
People educated at Harrow School
British Army personnel of the Anglo-Egyptian War
British Army personnel of the Second Boer War
British Army generals of World War I
Knights Grand Cross of the Royal Victorian Order
Knights Commander of the Order of the Bath